This is an incomplete list of battles fought by the Seljuk Empire.

( Color legend for the location of the battle )

References

Sources

Battles involving the Sultanate of Rum
Battles involving the Seljuk Empire